Plaza Popocatépetl is a plaza in Condesa, Mexico City, Mexico. The center of the plaza features an Art Deco fountain completed .

References

External links
 

Art Deco architecture in Mexico
Condesa
Fountains in Mexico
Plazas in Mexico City